Milena Rosner (born 4 January 1980) is a Polish volleyball player, a member of Poland women's national volleyball team in 2000–2008, a participant in the Olympic Games Beijing 2008, European Champion 2005, and Polish Champion in 2006 and 2009.

Personal life
In 2010, she gave birth to a son named Milan.

Career
In 2014, Rosner played as second libero in PGE Atom Trefl Sopot.

Sporting achievements

Clubs

CEV Champions League
  2006/2007 - with CV Tenerife

National championships
 2002/2003  Polish Cup, with Nafta-Gaz Piła
 2004/2005  Polish Championship, with Nafta-Gaz Piła
 2005/2006  Polish Championship, with MKS Muszynianka-Fakro Muszyna
 2006/2007  Spanish Championship, with CV Tenerife
 2007/2008  Italian Cup, with Foppapedretti Bergamo
 2008/2009  Polish Championship, with Bank BPS Muszynianka Fakro Muszyna
 2010/2011  Romanian Championship, with Dinamo București

National team
 2005  CEV European Championship

State awards
 2005  Gold Cross of Merit

References

External links
 ORLENLiga player profile

1980 births
Living people
Sportspeople from Słupsk
Polish women's volleyball players
Polish expatriates in Spain
Polish expatriate sportspeople
Olympic volleyball players of Poland
Volleyball players at the 2008 Summer Olympics
Recipients of the Gold Cross of Merit (Poland)
Expatriate volleyball players in Spain